Vernel or Vernell may refer to:

People

Given names 
 Vernel Bagneris, American actor
 Vernell Brown Jr., jazz pianist
 Vernell Coles, basketball player
 Vernel Fournier, jazz drummer

Surnames 
 Brian Vernel, Scottish actor

Other uses 
Vernel, a fabric softener produced by Henkel

See also 
Vernal (disambiguation)